Hollingworth Brook is a water course in Greater Manchester which originates at Hollingworth Lake and flows through the Ealees Valley where it merges with Shore Lane Brook to form Ealees Brook.

Tributaries

Brearley Brook
Longden End Brook
Shaw Moss Brook ?

Rivers of the Metropolitan Borough of Rochdale
Rivers of Greater Manchester
2